Hollywood Vampires is the third studio album by the American glam metal band L.A. Guns, released in 1991. While no track from the album topped the charts (and the band's success declined soon afterwards as their style fell out of commercial favor), Hollywood Vampires presents various shades of the band and is representative of the late 1980s/early 1990s glam metal scene, with riff-laden songs and big choruses on every song. The meticulous production gives the album a sound typical of the period — a full sound, with many background harmony vocals, layered guitars and additional keyboard tracks.

The album starts in a more somber note with "Over the Edge", which was used in the film Point Break, but the bulk of it consists of standard hard rockers, such as "Kiss My Love Goodbye" and "My Koo Ka Choo". The band aims for the ballad hit several times, in "Crystal Eyes", "It's Over Now" and the 1950s-style "I Found You", attempting to repeat the earlier success of their major single "The Ballad of Jayne". "Kiss my Love Goodbye" is featured in the 1992 comedy film Ladybugs.
 
The Japan pressing adds the original version of "Ain't the Same" from the Cuts EP, with the addition of several saxophone solos. The original CD and cassette releases featured a 3-D photo cover and a small pair of 3-D glasses was included.

Track listing

Personnel
L.A. Guns
 Phil Lewis – lead vocals
 Tracii Guns – lead guitar, 6 and 12-string acoustic guitars, slide guitar, theremin, backing vocals 
 Mick Cripps – rhythm guitar, acoustic guitar, slide guitar, keyboards, backing vocals, strings arrangements
 Kelly Nickels – bass guitar, backing vocals
 Steve Riley – drums, percussion, backing vocals

Additional musicians
Kevin Savigar – strings arrangements
John Townsend – additional backing vocals

Production
Michael James Jackson – producer, engineer
Chris Minto, Micajah Ryan, Pat Regan, Will Rogers – engineers
Jamie Seyberth, Jim Wirt, Ken Allroyd – assistant engineers
David Thoener, Micajah Ryan, Mick Guzauski – mixing at A&M Studios, Conway Studios and Lighthouse Studios, Hollywood, California
Rob Jazco, Ed Korengo, Gil Morales, Kevin Becka – mixing assistants
Stephen Marcussen – mastering at Precision Lacquer, Los Angeles
Mark Sullivan – production coordinator

Charts

Album

Singles

References

L.A. Guns albums
1991 albums
Polydor Records albums
Vertigo Records albums
Mercury Records albums